Bob Brecher (born 1949) is a British philosopher and Professor of Philosophy at the University of Brighton.
He is known for his expertise on ethics and political philosophy.
Brecher is co-director of Centre for Applied Philosophy, Politics and Ethics and a former president of Association for Social and Political Philosophy (2000-2003). He founded Res Publica in 1995.

Books
 Anselm's Argument: the Logic of Divine Existence (Gower, 1985)
 Torture and the Ticking Bomb (Blackwell, 2007)
 Getting What You Want? A Critique of Liberal Morality (Routledge, 1997)

Edited
 Liberalism and the New Europe, with Otakar Fleischmann (Avebury, 1993)
 The University in a Liberal State, with Otakar Fleischmann (Avebury, 1996)
 Nationalism and Racism in the Liberal Order, with Jo Halliday and Klára Kolinská (Avebury, 1998)
 The New Order of War (Rodopi, 2010)
 Discourses and Practices of Terrorism: Interrogating Terror, with Mark Devenney and Aaron Winter (Routledge, 2010)

References

External links
 Bob Brecher

21st-century British philosophers
Philosophy academics
Living people
1949 births
Political philosophers
Academics of the University of Brighton
Alumni of the University of Kent
Academic staff of the University of Khartoum